Dipleurinodes is a genus of moths of the family Crambidae.

Species
Dipleurinodes bueaensis (Maes, 1996)
Dipleurinodes comorensis Leraut, 1989
Dipleurinodes mineti Leraut, 1989
Dipleurinodes nigra Leraut, 1989
Dipleurinodes phaeopalpia (Hampson, 1917)
Dipleurinodes tavetae Maes, 2004

References

Scopariinae
Crambidae genera